HMS Cornwall was a 74-gun third-rate  built for the Royal Navy in the 1810s. She spent most of her service in reserve and was converted into a reformatory and a school ship in her later years. The ship was broken up in 1875.

Description
The ship's tonnage was 1,751  tons burthen. Her armament consisted of twenty-eight 32-pounder guns on the lower gundeck and twenty-eight 18-pounder guns on the upper deck. On the quarterdeck were four 12-pounder guns and ten 32-pounder carronades; the forecastle mounted two of each. After the end of the Napoleonic Wars in 1815, a pair of lower-deck guns were replaced by 68-pounder carronades and a pair of upper deck guns were superseded by 18-pounder carronades. The ship had a crew of 590 officers and ratings.

After she was razeed to a 50-gun fourth rate ship in 1830, her armament became twenty-eight 32-pounders on the lower gundeck, sixteen lighter 32-pounders on the upper deck and four more 32-pounders on the forecastle. Her crew was consequently reduced to 450 men.

Construction and career
Cornwall was the third ship in the Royal Navy to be named after the eponymous county. The ship was ordered on 30 May 1809 and contracted out to Mrs. Frances Bernard at Deptford. She was laid down in March 1809 and was launched on 16 January 1812. Cornwall served in the English Channel in the Napoleonic Wars.

In 1859 she was loaned to the London Association for use as a juvenile reformatory school. She was broken up at Sheerness in 1875.

Notes

References

Lavery, Brian (2003) The Ship of the Line - Volume 1: The Development of the Battlefleet 1650–1850. Conway Maritime Press. .

 

Ships of the line of the Royal Navy
Vengeur-class ships of the line
Prison ships
Training ships of the Royal Navy
Ships built in Deptford
1812 ships